Super Mario Bros.: The Great Mission to Rescue Princess Peach! is a 1986 Japanese animated adventure comedy film, based on the Super Mario Bros. (1985) video game. Directed by Masami Hata and produced by Masakatsu Suzuki and Tsunemasa Hatano, the plot centers on Mario and Luigi, who go on a quest to save Princess Peach from King Koopa.

It is one of the two first films based on a video game, along with Running Boy: Star Soldier's Secret, released on the same day. It is the earliest isekai anime to involve a virtual video game world.

Plot
Mario is playing a game on his Famicom late at night when he witnesses a woman on the television screen crying for help from enemies attacking her. She escapes by jumping out of the TV and introduces herself as Princess Peach. King Koopa appears and follows her out of the TV. Mario fights him, but is no match for Koopa, who successfully captures Peach and goes back into the TV. Mario discovers a small necklace that Peach left on the floor.

The next day, while he and his brother Luigi are working at their grocery store, Mario cannot stop thinking about Peach and the necklace. Luigi claims the jewel on the necklace is said to lead its owner to the Mushroom Kingdom, a supposed land of treasures. A small dog-like creature wanders into the store and snatches the necklace from Mario, prompting him and Luigi to give chase and fall down a pipe.

When they emerge, a mushroom hermit reveals that he ordered the dog, Kibidango, to bring the brothers to him. He explains that they are now in the Mushroom Kingdom, which is being ravaged by King Koopa and his army. Angry that his marriage proposal was spurned by Peach, Koopa is turning the citizens into inanimate objects, and plans to force Peach into marriage on Friday the 13th. The hermit reveals a legend that claims the Mario Bros. can defeat Koopa, and that they will need to find the three mystical Power-Ups to overcome his magic: the Mushroom, the Flower, and the Star. With the three Power-Ups hidden throughout the Mushroom Kingdom by Koopa's forces, the Mario Bros. set out to find them, guided by Kibidango.

After a long journey with many perilous obstacles, the brothers eventually acquire all three Power-Ups. That night, Mario arrives at King Koopa's castle just as the wedding is starting. With the help of the three Power-Ups, Mario successfully defeats Koopa, breaking his spell and restoring the Mushroom Kingdom to normal. When Mario returns Peach's necklace, Kibidango reverts to his true form, Prince Haru of the Flower Kingdom. Haru explains that he is Peach's fiancé, but also explains that Koopa turned him into Kibidango to marry her in his place. Though heartbroken, Mario wishes the couple well and promises to return if they ever need help, and as they accept it, he and Luigi begin their long journey home.

In a post-credits scene, King Koopa and his minions are now working at the brothers' grocery store as punishment.

Voice cast

Soundtrack
The film's soundtrack was scored by Toshiyuki Kimori. It includes these songs:

 "Doki-Doki Do It!" by Mirai Douji
 "Doki-Doki Do It! (Rock'n Roll Version)" by Mirai Douji
  by Mami Yamase
  by Mami Yamase

The film uses music and sound effects from the Super Mario Bros. video game. An LP was released.

Production and release

In 1986, Mario was already popular in Japan, so Grouper Productions collaborated with Nintendo to produce an anime film. To advertise the film, they released Mario phone cards, watches, rice containers, ramen noodles, a manga, an art book, three riddle books, a picture book, and an original soundtrack released on vinyl and cassette. 

On July 20, 1986, the film was released in theaters across Japan. VAP Video later released the film on retail VHS and Betamax in Japan, with no releases internationally or on DVD or Blu-ray.

Legacy
The film is one of the two first based on a video game, along with Running Boy: Star Soldier's Secret, released the same day. It predates the live-action Super Mario Bros. film by seven years.

It is the earliest isekai anime to involve a virtual video game world, and the earliest isekai anime to involve the protagonist being trapped in the virtual world of a video game. Because it involves Mario playing a video game that comes to life, it is an ancestor of the "trapped in a video game" subgenre of isekai anime.

Fan restoration
In July 2021, Carnivol released a 16mm film scan on YouTube and announced that fan restoration group Kineko Video would restore it in 4K, which was released on April 16, 2022.

See also
 List of films based on video games

Notes

References

External links

 
 

1980s children's animated films
1986 anime films
Anime films based on video games
1980s Japanese-language films
Films about twin brothers
Animated films about turtles
Films about princesses
Films about giants
Films about kidnapping
Films directed by Masami Hata
Isekai anime and manga
Japanese children's fantasy films
Mario (franchise) films
Animated films about brothers
1980s rediscovered films
Rediscovered Japanese films